Malanti Chiefs is a Eswatini soccer club based in Piggs Peak.

Achievements
Swazi Cup: 1
 2008.

Performance in CAF competitions
CAF Confederation Cup: 1 appearance
2009 – First Round

Notes

Football clubs in Eswatini